Laththi, also known as Laththi Charge (Lathi/Baton Charge), is a 2022 Indian Tamil-language action thriller film written and directed by A. Vinoth Kumar in his directorial debut and produced by Ramana and Nandha Durairaj of Rana Productions. The film stars Vishal, Sunaina and Prabhu. The film's music and score is composed by Yuvan Shankar Raja, with cinematography handled by Balasubramaniem and Balakrishna Thota and editing done by N. B. Srikanth.

This is the second collaboration of Vishal and Sunaina after Samar and Vishal's first collaboration with Vinoth Kumar. It was shot extensively across Tamil Nadu including Thiruvanmiyur and Chennai and the final schedule in Hyderabad.

The film was initially scheduled to be released in theaters on 12 August 2022, but got postponed to 15 September 2022 due to multiple injuries of actor Vishal and heavy visual effects for the fight sequences although the release date was postponed again indefinitely. The film was released in theatres on 22 December 2022 to mixed reviews from critics who praised Vishal's performance, action sequences, soundtrack and background score but criticism aimed at its predictability.

Plot 
Muruganantham, a police constable, lives with his wife Kavitha and 10-year-old son Rasu, who is suffering from wheezing problem, which particularly flares up when he becomes scared. One day, Muruganantham gets suspended due to having tortured an innocent civilian, who is suspected for assaulting a girl named Pavithra, who subsequently dies. 6 months later, Muruganantham manages to revoke his suspension with help from DSP Ranganathan, where he joins back on duty.

One night, DIG Kamal tells Muruganantham to torture a suspect for harassing his daughter. Muruganantham relucantly tortures the suspect, where it is revealed that the suspect is actually Vellai, the son of an influential mafia kingpin named Sura. Enraged about Vellai's torture, Sura manages to learn about Muruganantham and sends his henchmen to bring him. Muruganantham and Rasu escape from Sura's henchmen, and they are trapped in an under-construction building. Muruganantham finds a place for Rasu to hide, but it is revealed that Rasu is not feeling well and needs his inhaler which is in his bag near the ground floor of the building.

Muruganantham attempts to reach the ground floor, but Vellai and his men capture and beat Muruganantham with a laththi in the same manner that Muruganantham had beaten him. Muruganantham tells that he knew about Vellai earlier and his involvement behind Pavithra's death. Muruganantham also reveals that he purposely brought Sura, Vellai and their henchmen to the building in order to avenge Pavithra's death, and also secretly brought weapons from the police station's weaponry to attack the henchmen. After the revelation, Muruganantham escapes, where he sets off machine guns and kills most of the henchmen. Rasu attempts to escape the building, but is captured by Vellai.

Rasu is buried alive and Muruganantham desperately comes down and attempts to find his son. He pleads with Vellai's men to tell him where Rasu is, to which Vella responds by stabbing and injuring Muruganantham. After a brief emotional breakdown worrying over his son's fate, Muruganantham is able to find Rasu and administer the inhaler. With his laththi, Muruganantham attacks the henchmen and viciously beats them. He overpowers Sura and manages to kill him, before kicking Vellai of the building, thus avenging Pavithra's death. Muruganantham reunites with Rasu, where he tells him that to forget that the incident ever happened, and then leaves the building.

Cast

Production

Development 
The film was tentatively titled as Vishal32. On 17 October 2021, the film's official title was unveiled as Laththi Charge, which was chosen as it would work across multiple languages. At the same time, it was reported that the film will have a pan-Indian release (in Tamil, Telugu, Malayalam, Kannada and Hindi) and will be released in the month of September although the release date got postponed.

Casting 
Vishal was once again signed to play the role of a cop after previously appearing in cop roles in films like Veeramae Vaagai Soodum, Ayogya and Paayum Puli and  Vedi  and
Satyam. Sunaina was signed in to play the female lead which marks her second collaboration with Vishal after Samar. The makers announced that Ramana who produced the film was cast as the main antagonist in the film. Veteran actor Prabhu was signed in to play an important role in this film which marks his third collaboration with the lead actor after Aambala and Thaamirabharani.

Filming 
Principal photography of the film began on 29 August 2021. The first schedule is taking place on Thiruvanmiyur and was wrapped up on 14 September 2021. The second schedule taking place in Chennai and wrapped up on 13 December 2021. The third schedule taking place in Hyderabad. During this phase, Vishal was injured while filming an action sequence in early February 2022, with multiple hairline fractures on one of his hands, and he took a break from shooting to heal. After recovering, he returned to shooting in March with increased caution exercised during stunts. On 14 May 2022, the crew would begin the dubbing process for the movie. On 15 July 2022, the film was wrapped completed. The post production works of the film began on 7 December 2022.

Soundtrack 
Sam C. S. was earlier chosen as the composer of the film's score and soundtrack. Later, on April 4, 2022, it was reported that he has been replaced by Yuvan Shankar Raja. The audio rights were acquired by U1 Records. The first single "Thotta Load Aage Waiting" was released on 5 October 2022. The second single " Oonjal Manam" was released on 13 November 2022. The third single titled "Veerathukkor Niramundu" was released on 19 December 2022.

Release

Theatrical 
The film was released in theatres on 22 December 2022 coinciding with Christmas. The film was initially planned for release in theatres on 12 August 2022, but got postponed to 15 September 2022 due to multiple injuries of actor Vishal and heavy visual effects for the fight sequences although the release date was again postponed indefinitely. The distribution rights of the film in Tamil Nadu were acquired by Udhayanidhi Stalin under the banner of Red Giant Movies. The Andhra Pradesh and Telangana distribution rights of the film have been bagged by JPR Films.

Home media 
The post-theatrical streaming rights of the film has been sold to Sun NXT and Netflix, while the satellite rights of the film is sold to Sun TV.The Hindi version of the film was telecast through Star Gold on 12 March 2023.

Reception
Laththi received mixed reviews from critics and audience who praised Vishal's performance, action sequences, soundtrack and background score but criticism aimed at its predictability.

Logesh Balachandran of The Times of India gave the film 2.5 out of 5 and wrote "Laththi gives forceful blows at times, but only a few make us feel the real pain." Janani K of India Today gave the film's rating 2.5 out of 5 stars and wrote "On the whole, Laththi is a different cop film and engaging for the most part." Arvind V of Pinkvilla gave the film's rating 2.5 out of 5 and wrote "Yuvan Shankar Raja's background music uplifts some banal action frames. Balasubramaniem and Balakrishna Thota helm the cinematography department." Vishal Menon of Film Companion wrote "With a hilarious emotional outburst 
towards the end and even an funnier resolution to the issue that got him suspended in the first place, Laththi’s strongest blows are those dealt to our intellect." 

Khalillulah of Hindu Tamil Thisai wrote "All in all, Laththi, which has developed into an action masala, beats the enemies without noticing logical errors. Even though it was the villains who were beaten, screamed?" Shameena Parveen of Samayam Tamil gave the film 2.5 out of 5 stars and wrote "Vishal has changed his body language for the role of constable. You can see it. Yuvan Shankar Raja's music and BGM are outstanding." Praveen Sudevan of The Hindu wrote "Though it’s Vishal who single-handedly takes down over a hundred thugs, we are the ones who get tired of it." Naveen Kumar of The Indian Express wrote "The film can be a treat for action fans. On the whole, even if the screenplay shows the excitement and excitement shown by them in the fight scenes, this would not be an ordinary film but a great film."

Thinkal Menon of OTT Play gave the film's rating 2.5 out of 5 stars and wrote "Laththi has Vishal putting his best foot forward in stunt and emotional sequences, but his hard work required a far more engaging screenplay and character design." A critic for India Herald wrote "Laththi occasionally strikes us hard, but only a few of them actually hurt." Navein Darshan of Cinema Express gave the film 2 out of 5 stars and wrote "Though Laththi tries hard to be an edge-of-the-seat thriller, it's not a good sign that you're laughing for most of it."

References

External links 

2022 films
2020s Tamil-language films
Films shot in Chennai
Films shot in Telangana
2022 directorial debut films
Indian police films
2022 action thriller films
Indian action thriller films